Karuvakkurichi is a village in the Tiruvarur district of Tamil Nadu, India. It is located in the Mannargudi.

More than 2000 people live in this village, with 95% of them belonging to Kallar (Mukkulathor) community.

References 

Villages in Tiruvarur district